361 Bononia  is a very large, resonant  Hilda asteroid located in the outermost region of the asteroid belt. It is classified as a D-type asteroid and is probably composed of organic rich silicates, carbon and anhydrous silicates.

References

External links
 
 

000361
Discoveries by Auguste Charlois
Named minor planets
000361
18930311